Silver Creek Township is a township in Pottawattamie County, Iowa, USA.

History
Silver Creek Township was organized in 1858.

References

Townships in Pottawattamie County, Iowa
Townships in Iowa